Kuş is a Turkish word meaning "bird". It may refer to:

People
 Armağan Kuş (born 1992), Turkish footballer
 Emrah Kuş (born 1988), Turkish Greco-Roman wrestler
 Kübra Kuş (born 1994), Turkish female water polo player
 Nafia Kuş (born 1995), Turkish female taekwondo practitioner

Places
 Kuş Island, a small island within Lake Van
 Kuşadası, a district of Aydın Province in Turkey
 Lake Kuş, a lake in western Turkey

Motif
 Kuş, the bird Kilim motif, symbolising luck and happiness

See also
 Kus (disambiguation)

Surnames
Turkish-language surnames